Munlochy (Scottish Gaelic: Poll Lochaidh) is a small village, lying at the head of Munlochy Bay (Ob Poll Lochaidh), in the Black Isle in Ross and Cromarty, in northern Scotland.

There are few early records of a settlement, but it seems likely that Munlochy expanded in the 1760s due to quarry workers extracting stone nearby to build Fort George on the far side of the Moray Firth.

Geography
Munlochy sits at the top of the tidal inlet of Munlochy Bay, that is itself an opening of the Moray Firth.

Munlochy Bridge
This is the name of popular pipe tune, a two line, three part Strathspey, which is often played for dancing.

See also
 Clootie well
 Black Isle

References
https://musescore.com/song/munlochy_bridge-2126599

Populated places on the Black Isle